Iuri Queli Tomás Medeiros Almeida Gomes (born 11 October 1996) is a Portuguese footballer on Angolan descent who plays for Vila Real as a forward.

Football career
On 21 January 2015, Gomes made his professional debut with Rio Ave in a 2014–15 Taça da Liga match against Académica.

Personal
He is a nephew of Gil. Gil's son and Iuri's cousin Angel Gomes is in the Manchester United junior system.

References

External links

Iuri Gomes at ZeroZero

1996 births
Living people
People from Faial Island
Portuguese sportspeople of Angolan descent
Portuguese footballers
Association football forwards
Rio Ave F.C. players
S.C. Farense players
Juventude de Pedras Salgadas players
Vilaverdense F.C. players
C.D.C. Montalegre players
Caldas S.C. players
F.C. Bravos do Maquis players
G.D. Fabril players
S.C. Vila Real players
Liga Portugal 2 players